Wayne Jentas is a Canadian retired soccer midfielder who played in the North American Soccer League, American Soccer League, Major Indoor Soccer League and American Indoor Soccer Association. He later coached at the youth, college and professional levels.

Player

Although born in Canada, Jentas spent most of his youth in Derby, England. He began playing in 1972. In 1978, he signed with the Vancouver Whitecaps of the North American Soccer League. In 1979, he moved to the Rochester Lancers. In 1980, he played for the Columbus Magic in the American Soccer League. In the fall of 1980, he signed with the Cleveland Force of the Major Indoor Soccer League. After one season, he moved to the Canton Invaders of the American Indoor Soccer Association.

Coach
Since retirement he has coached at numerous teams. From 1982 to 1986, he was the junior varsity soccer coach at Hudson High School. During this time, he also spent one season, 1984–1985, as an assistant with the Canton Invaders. On 11 October 1991, he was named an assistant coach with the Cleveland Crunch. On 26 February 1993, Jentas replaced Paul Kitson as head coach of the Denver Thunder. He later coached the College of Wooster soccer team. He has also coached the East-West Premier Soccer Club. He is currently the Director of Pennine United.

References

External links
NASL stats

1954 births
American Indoor Soccer Association players
American Soccer League (1933–1983) players
Canadian soccer players
Canton Invaders players
Cleveland Force (original MISL) players
Columbus Magic players
English footballers
Major Indoor Soccer League (1978–1992) players
National Professional Soccer League (1984–2001) coaches
North American Soccer League (1968–1984) players
Footballers from Derby
Rochester Lancers (1967–1980) players
Vancouver Whitecaps (1974–1984) players
Living people
Soccer players from Toronto
Association football midfielders
English expatriate sportspeople in the United States
Expatriate soccer players in the United States
English expatriate footballers
English expatriate sportspeople in Canada
Expatriate soccer players in Canada
English football managers